The Jog night frog or Jog's night frog (Nyctibatrachus jog) is one of 12 species of nocturnal frogs in the genus Nyctibatrachus. It is found exclusively in the Western Ghats, India, and both sexes share the responsibility of watching over the eggs.

Description
It is a plump frog, with a wide, short head, and a skin fold from the eye to the shoulder. The fore legs are very short and the hands are large, with broad discs on the finger tips. The hind legs are longer and the feet have partially webbed toes and disc-like toe pads. The colour of the dorsal surface is black with grey markings and the limbs are grey with dark bands. The throat region is reddish-brown and the belly is pale grey. The male has reddish-brown femoral glands on his hind legs and a vocal sac that inflates sidewards.

Distribution and habitat
It lives in seasonal streams or among vegetation close to the streams which swell during the monsoon season.

Reproduction
Breeding takes place during the monsoon season. The male chooses a suitable spot for egg deposition on a branch, leaf, or steep rock about a metre (yard) above a stream. Here, he calls to attract a female. When she arrives, he grasps her in a vigorous amplexus, but the eggs are not laid until after he dismounts. The female attaches the cluster of eggs to the spot chosen by the male and then departs. The male then stands over the eggs. Over the period of about eight days until the eggs hatch, both parents remain close to the clutch, often straddling it, presumably preventing the eggs from becoming dehydrated and preventing predators from eating them. When the tadpoles emerge from the gelatinous coating of the eggs, they fall into the water below, where they continue their development. They undergo metamorphosis in about 32 days.

References

Nyctibatrachus
Endemic fauna of the Western Ghats
Frogs of India
Amphibians described in 2011
Taxa named by Sathyabhama Das Biju